HD 213429 is a spectroscopic binary system in the equatorial constellation of Aquarius. It has a combined apparent magnitude of 6.16 and is located around 83 light years away. The pair orbit each other with a period of 631 days, at an average separation of 1.74 AU and an eccentricity of 0.38.

References

External links
 Image HD 213429
 high proper motion star
 adsabs.harvard.edu/

Aquarius (constellation)
213429
F-type main-sequence stars
8581
Spectroscopic binaries
Durchmusterung objects
111170
Gliese and GJ objects